Shalmaneser III (Šulmānu-ašarēdu, "the god Shulmanu is pre-eminent") was king of the Neo-Assyrian Empire from the death of his father Ashurnasirpal II in 859 BC to his own death in 824 BC.

His long reign was a constant series of campaigns against the eastern tribes, the Babylonians, the nations of Mesopotamia and Syria, as well as Kizzuwadna and Urartu. His armies penetrated to Lake Van and the Taurus Mountains; the Neo-Hittites of Carchemish were compelled to pay tribute, and the kingdoms of Hamath and Aram Damascus were subdued. It is in the annals of Shalmaneser III from the 850s BC that the Arabs and Chaldeans first appear in recorded history.

Reign

Campaigns
Shalmaneser began a campaign against the Urartian Kingdom and reported that in 858 BC he destroyed the city of Sugunia and then in 853 BC also Araškun. Both cities are assumed to have been capitals of the Kingdom before Tushpa became a center for the Urartians. In 853 BC, a coalition was formed by 11 states, mainly by Hadadezer (Hadad-ezer) the Aramean king of Damascus, Irhuleni king of Hamath, Ahab king of Israel, Gindibu king of the Arabs, and some other rulers who fought the Assyrian king at the Battle of Qarqar. The result of the battle was not decisive, and Shalmaneser III had to fight his enemies several times again in the coming years, which eventually resulted in the occupation of the Levant (modern Syria and Lebanon) and Arabia by the Assyrian Empire.

In 851 BC, following a rebellion in Babylon, Shalmaneser led a campaign against Marduk-bēl-ušate, younger brother of the king, Marduk-zakir-shumi I, who was an ally of Shalmaneser. In the second year of the campaign, Marduk-bēl-ušate was forced to retreat and was killed. A record of these events was made on the Black Obelisk:

Against Israel

In 841 BC, Shalmaneser campaigned against Hadadezer's successor Hazael, forcing him to take refuge within the walls of his capital. While Shalmaneser was unable to capture Damascus, he devastated its territory, and Jehu of Israel (whose ambassadors are represented on the Black Obelisk now in the British Museum), together with the Phoenician cities, prudently sent tribute to him in perhaps 841 BC. Babylonia had already been conquered, including the areas occupied by migrant Chaldaean, Sutean and Aramean tribes, and the Babylonian king had been put to death.

Against Tibareni
In 836 BC, Shalmaneser sent an expedition against the Tibareni (Tabal) which was followed by one against Cappadocia, and in 832 BC came another campaign against Urartu. In the following year, age required the king to hand over the command of his armies to the Tartan (turtānu commander-in-chief) Dayyan-Assur, and six years later, Nineveh and other cities revolted against him under his rebel son Assur-danin-pal. Civil war continued for two years; but the rebellion was at last crushed by Shamshi-Adad V, another son of Shalmaneser. Shalmaneser died soon afterwards.

Later campaigns

Despite the rebellion later in his reign, Shalmanesar had proven capable of expanding the frontiers of the Neo-Assyrian Empire, stabilising its hold over the Khabur and mountainous frontier region of the Zagros, contested with Urartu.

In Biblical studies
His reign is significant to Biblical studies because two of his monuments name rulers from Hebrew Bible. The Black Obelisk names Jehu son of Omri (although Jehu was misidentified as a son of Omri). The Kurkh Monolith names king Ahab, in reference to the Battle of Qarqar.

Construction and the Black Obelisk

He had built a palace at Kalhu (Biblical Calah, modern Nimrud), and left several editions of the royal annals recording his military campaigns, the last of which is engraved on the Black Obelisk from Calah.

The Black Obelisk is a significant artifact from his reign.  It is a black limestone, bas-relief sculpture from Nimrud (ancient Kalhu), in northern Iraq. It is the most complete Assyrian obelisk yet discovered, and is historically significant because it displays the earliest ancient depiction of an Israelite. On the top and the bottom of the reliefs there is a long cuneiform inscription recording the annals of Shalmaneser III. It lists the military campaigns which the king and his commander-in-chief headed every year, until the thirty-first year of reign. Some features might suggest that the work had been commissioned by the commander-in-chief, Dayyan-Ashur.

The second register from the top includes the earliest surviving picture of an Israelite: the Biblical Jehu, king of Israel. Jehu severed Israel's alliances with Phoenicia and Judah, and became subject to Assyria. It describes how Jehu brought or sent his tribute in or around 841 BC. The caption above the scene, written in Assyrian cuneiform, can be translated:

"The tribute of Jehu, son of Omri: I received from him silver, gold, a golden bowl, a golden vase with pointed bottom, golden tumblers, golden buckets, tin, a staff for a king [and] spears."

It was erected as a public monument in 825 BC at a time of civil war. It was discovered by archaeologist Sir Austen Henry Layard in 1846.

Gallery

See also
List of artifacts significant to the Bible
Black Obelisk of Shalmaneser III
Short chronology timeline

Notes

References

Sources

External links

 Gates of Shalmanser III and Assurnasirpal. Bronze Reliefs from the Gates of Shalmaneser King of Assyria 
 Black Obelisk of Shalmaneser III Babylonian and Assyrian Literature.
 Black Obelisk of Shalmaneser III

9th-century BC Assyrian kings
824 BC deaths
Year of birth unknown
Kings of the Lands